Middle Sandy Presbyterian Church (also known as Western Columbiana County Historical Society Museum; COL-13-1) is a historic church on Homeworth Road in Homeworth, Ohio.

It was built in 1853 and added to the National Register in 1994.

References

Presbyterian churches in Ohio
Churches on the National Register of Historic Places in Ohio
Churches completed in 1853
19th-century Presbyterian church buildings in the United States
Buildings and structures in Columbiana County, Ohio
National Register of Historic Places in Columbiana County, Ohio